Abzanovo (Abźan) is a rural locality (a selo) and the administrative centre of Abzanovsky Selsoviet, Zianchurinsky District, Bashkortostan, Russia. The population was 882 as of 2010. There are 14 streets.

Geography 
Abzanovo is located 48 km south of Isyangulovo (the district's administrative centre) by road. Niyazgulovo is the nearest rural locality.

Ethnicity 
The village is inhabited by Bashkirs and others.

References 

Rural localities in Zianchurinsky District